Gyan Ranjan  was an Indian politician. He was a Member of Parliament, representing Bihar in the Rajya Sabha, the upper house of India's Parliament, representing the Indian National Congress.

References

Rajya Sabha members from Bihar
1947 births
1998 deaths
Indian National Congress politicians from Bihar